Lost in Time is a 2019 Kenyan film written by Edijoe Mwaniki. It is a psychological thriller which focuses on the issue of mental health.

So far, the film has won five Kalasha awards in total. The awards categories includes "The best feature film", "best director" (Peter Kawa), "best actor in the film" (George Mo), "best screenplay" (Edijoe Mwaniki) and "best sound design" (Karanja Kiarie).

Synopsis 
After Sam's mother's death, he is stuck in the memory, as that day happens to be the same day he almost lost his daughter. This affects him psychologically, and he tries fighting his fears. He starts living in his friend Michael's servant quarters, but soon notices strange things going on in the house. He attempts to unravel the mysteries concerning the house and his friend's strange wife, while fighting his fears, both past and current.

Cast 
 George Mo as Sam Weto
 Lucy Njoroge as Dr. Lilian Kareithi
 Alan Oyugi as Michael Kareithi
 Sheila Murugi as Judy Weto
 Natasha Sakawa as Sifa Weto

References

External links 
 

2019 films
2019 psychological thriller films
Kenyan drama films
Kenyan thriller films